Dębie may refer to the following places:
Dębie, Masovian Voivodeship (east-central Poland)
Dębie, Opole Voivodeship (south-west Poland)
Dębie, Silesian Voivodeship (south Poland)